Gaël Fickou (born 26 March 1994) is a French rugby union player who plays for French club Racing 92. His usual position is in the Centre or  Wing.

Club career
Fickou made his Heineken Cup debut on 14 October 2012, scoring the only try of the game in a win against Leicester Tigers. His lithe movement, balance and pace for his size has seen him compared to English rugby legend Jeremy Guscott. 

According to Toulouse and France teammate, Maxime Médard, Fickou "is one of the 10 best centres in the world and soon he will be number one. He reminds me of Sonny Bill Williams: tall, athletic, technical, with a good hand-off and a feel for the game. He has everything."

After spending six seasons with Toulouse, he signed with Stade Français for the start of the 2018–19 season.

On 22 March 2021, Fickou would leave Stade Français to join with Top 14 rivals Racing 92 ahead of the 2021–22 season.

International career
He made his French international debut at the age of 18 against Scotland on 16 March 2013 in the RBS 6 Nations.

Fickou scored his first try for France against the England during the 2014 Six Nations.

International tries

Honours

International 
 France
Six Nations Championship: 2022
Grand Slam: 2022

Personal life
Born in France, Fickou is one of six children. His dad is originally from Casamance in Senegal and his mother is a French of Pied-Noir descent.

References

External links
France profile at FFR

ERC profile

1994 births
Living people
People from La Seyne-sur-Mer
Sportspeople from Var (department)
French rugby union players
French sportspeople of Senegalese descent
French sportspeople of Algerian descent
Stade Toulousain players
Stade Français players
Racing 92 players
Rugby union centres
France international rugby union players